The Uniform Limited Liability Company Act (ULLCA), which includes a 2006 revision called the Revised Uniform Limited Liability Company Act, is a uniform act (similar to a model statute), proposed by the National Conference of Commissioners on Uniform State Laws ("NCCUSL") for the governance of limited liability companies (often called LLCs) by U.S. states.  The ULLCA was originally promulgated in 1995 and amended in 1996 and 2006. It has been enacted in 20 U.S. jurisdictions: Alabama, Arizona, Arkansas, California, Connecticut, the District of Columbia, Florida, Idaho, Illinois, Iowa, Minnesota, Nebraska, New Jersey, North Dakota, Pennsylvania, South Dakota, Utah, Vermont, Washington, and Wyoming.

See also
List of Uniform Acts (United States)

References

External links
The Revised Uniform Limited Liability Company Act (2006) (Other formats: PDF or Word)
The Uniform Limited Liability Company Act (1996)  (Other formats: PDF or WordPerfect 6.1)
(Revised) NCCUSL's page for the Revised Uniform Limited Liability Company Act (2006)
NCCUSL's page for the Uniform Limited Liability Company Act (1996)
Popular Approaches to Judicial Dissolution of an LLC

Partnership